Vincent M. Ward (born January 27, 1971), also known as Vincent Ward, is an American actor. He is best known for his roles on The Starter Wife and The Walking Dead.

Early life and education
Vincent M. Ward is a Dayton, Ohio native. Ward graduated from Trotwood-Madison High School in Ohio.

Career

Film and television
Ward has had a host of small roles in film and television such as a bodyguard on Everybody Hates Chris, Hollis on True Blood, a bodyguard in Hot in Cleveland, and Darren, a mailman in Wilfred.

His most notable television roles are Bo in The Starter Wife, and Oscar on The Walking Dead.

Ward's film work includes Ocean's Eleven, Live-Evil, and 2016.

Theater
Ward played the role of Kenzo in the play "Nylons" by Brandi Burks in Los Angeles in 2011. In 2015 Ward performed in The Conversation at the AMCE Theatre, Hollywood.

Spoken word
In 2012 Ward released a spoken word album Eargasms (Dont Talk Just Listen).

Filmography

References

External links
 
 

20th-century African-American people
21st-century African-American people
21st-century American male actors
African-American male actors
American male film actors
American male stage actors
American male television actors
1971 births
Living people
Male actors from Dayton, Ohio